Elizabeth of Scotland is a title, not in common usage, that might be applied to a number of women:

Elizabeth de Burgh (c.1284-1327), queen consort of Robert the Bruce
Elizabeth Stewart, Countess of Crawford, Princess of Scotland
Elizabeth Stuart, Queen of Bohemia (1596-1662), born as Princess Elizabeth of Scotland
Elizabeth Stuart (daughter of Charles I) (1635-1650), daughter of Charles I, King of England, Scotland and Ireland
Elizabeth II of the United Kingdom (1926-2022), who was sovereign of Scotland, England, Ireland and other countries